{{Speciesbox
| genus = Conorhynchos
| image = https://www.fishbase.se/images/species/Cocon_ud.jpg
| status = EN
| status_system = IUCN3.1
| parent_authority = Bleeker, 1858
| species = conirostris
| display_parents = 3
| authority = (Valenciennes, 1840)
| synonyms = * Conorhynchus conirostris(Valenciennes, 1840)
 Conorhynchus glaberSteindachner, 1877
 Conorynchus conirostris(Valenciennes, 1840)
 Pimelodus conirostrisValenciennes, 1840
}}Conorhynchos conirostris is a species of catfish (order Siluriformes).

The spelling of the generic name has been confused; it is currently valid as Conorhynchos as described by Pieter Bleeker in 1858. This catfish has unknown relationships. It does not appear to be assignable to any family and is placed incertae sedis. However, it has been grouped into the superfamily Pimelodoidea due to molecular evidence.Conorhynchos conirostris'' is endemic to the São Francisco River in Brazil and is considered a symbol of the river. This fish can reach  in standard length and 13 kilograms (29 lb) in weight. This fish is of commercial interest, and is considered threatened by Brazil's Ministry of the Environment.

References

Taxa named by Pieter Bleeker
Catfish of South America
Fish of the São Francisco River basin
Endemic fauna of Brazil
Monotypic freshwater fish genera
Catfish genera